James Henry Leslie Pennell (1906-1996) was Provost of St Andrew's Cathedral, Inverness from 1949 to 1965.

He was educated at the University of Edinburgh and  ordained in 1930 after a period of study at Edinburgh Theological College. He began his ecclesiastical career as Precentor at Inverness Cathedral. After this he was Rector of Dunblane until he became Provost.

Notes

1906 births
Alumni of the University of Edinburgh
Alumni of Edinburgh Theological College
Provosts of Inverness Cathedral
1996 deaths